And Now the Legacy Begins is the debut album of Canadian hip hop duo Dream Warriors, released April 23, 1991. It was released worldwide on Island Records and in the United States on sub-label 4th & B'way Records (although it was not a hit in the U.S.). The album is regarded as one of the finest alternative hip hop records of the golden era.

Singles
"My Definition of a Boombastic Jazz Style", the album's most successful single, sampled Quincy Jones' "Soul Bossa Nova" — which was also known to Canadian audiences as the longtime theme music of the television game show Definition and later was known as theme for the Austin Powers movie series. The song was a hit in both Canada and Europe, winning a Juno Award for Rap Recording of the Year in 1992,. "Wash Your Face in My Sink" and "Ludi" were also notable singles.

Reception

The album received high critical acclaim. Spin highly recommended the album, praising its "stunning, almost seamless sample-driven tracks." Ned Raggett of AllMusic gave it 4½ out of 5 stars, noting that "the duo plays around with any number of inspired samples and grooves, from jazz to harder-edged beats, with style and skill." Robert Christgau of The Village Voice gave the album a three-star honorable mention, and quipped that it was "West Indian daisy age from boogie-down Toronto", choosing the tracks "Ludi" and "My Definition of a Boombastic Jazz Style" as highlights.

It peaked at #18 on the UK Albums Chart and #34 in Canada, where it received gold certification. Over 800,000 copies were sold worldwide. 

In 2013, the album made Ballast's list of the top 50 Canadian albums of all time. In 2018, the album won the Polaris Heritage Prize Jury Award in the 1986-1995 category.

Track listing

Samples
"My Definition of a Boombastic Jazz Style" – Contains a sample of "Soul Bossa Nova" by Quincy Jones
"Ludi" – Contains a sample of "My Conversation" by Slim Smith & The Uniques
"U Never Know a Good Thing Till You Lose It" – Contains samples of "Sing a Happy Song" by War and "Wild and Loose" and "The Walk" by The Time
"And Now the Legacy Begins" – Contains samples of "Shine Your Light" by The Graingers and "Genius of Love" by Tom Tom Club
"Tune from the Mission Channel" – Contains a sample of "Oh Honey" by Delegation
"Wash Your Face in My Sink" – Contains a sample of "Hang on Sloopy" by Count Basie
"Face in the Basin" – Contains samples of "Think (About It)" by Lyn Collins and "Funky Stuff" by Kool & the Gang
"Twelve Sided Dice" – Contains a sample of "Riding High" by Faze-O
"Answer for the Owl" – Contains a sample of "Just Kissed My Baby" by The Meters

Chart positions

Accolades

(*) signifies unordered lists

Personnel
Adapted credits from the liner notes of And Now the Legacy Begins.
Pete Ashworth – Photography
Dream Warriors – Producer, Mixing
Krush – Producer
Maximum 60 – Producer, Engineer, Mixing
Ron Nelson – Producer, Engineer
Split Personality – Producer, Mixing
Swifty – Artwork
Wrighty – Artwork

References

1991 debut albums
4th & B'way Records albums
Dream Warriors albums
Island Records albums